Spudich is a surname. Notable people with the surname include: 

James Spudich, American biochemist
Josef Spudich (1908–2001), American football player